William Barclay Charles (April 3, 1861 – November 25, 1950) was an American politician from New York.

Life
Born in Glasgow, Scotland, Charles attended private schools and high schools in Stirling and Glasgow, Scotland.  He immigrated to the United States in 1884 and spent two years ranching in Texas and Mexico.

He settled in Amsterdam, New York, in 1886 and engaged in textile manufacturing.  He was a member of the New York State Assembly (Montgomery Co.) in 1904, 1905 and 1906. He served as director of the Amsterdam First National Bank.

Charles was elected as a Republican to the 64th United States Congress, holding office from March 4, 1915, to March 3, 1917. Charles continued in the textile business until his retirement.

Charles was a presidential elector in the 1924 presidential election.

He died in Amsterdam, New York, November 25, 1950, and was interred in Green Hill Cemetery.

References

1861 births
1950 deaths
Republican Party members of the New York State Assembly
People from Amsterdam, New York
Republican Party members of the United States House of Representatives from New York (state)
1924 United States presidential electors